Mokobaxane is a village in Central District of Botswana. The village is located a few kilometres from a larger village of Mopipi close to Makgadikgadi Pan, and it has a primary school. The population was 1,290 in 2001 census.

References

Populated places in Central District (Botswana)
Villages in Botswana